Legion may refer to:

Military 
 Roman legion, the basic military unit of the ancient Roman army
Aviazione Legionaria, Italian air force during the Spanish civil war
 A legion is the regional unit of the Italian carabinieri
 Spanish Legion, an elite military unit within the Spanish Army
 Condor Legion, a unit of military personnel from the air force and army of Nazi Germany
 French Foreign Legion, a part of the French Army, created for foreign nationals willing to serve in the French Armed Forces
 International Legion of Territorial Defense of Ukraine, a Ukrainian foreign volunteer wing of the 2022 Russo-Ukrainian war
 HMS Legion (1914), a Royal Navy World War I destroyer
 HMS Legion (G74), a Royal Navy World War II destroyer sunk in 1942
 Legion of the United States, a reorganization of the United States Army from 1792 to 1796
 Various military legions, often composed of soldiers from a specific ethnic, national, religious or ideological background

Veterans' organizations 
 American Legion, an organization of American veterans
 The Royal British Legion, a UK charity providing support for members of the British Armed Forces and their dependents
 Royal Canadian Legion, a non-profit Canadian veterans' organization
 South African Legion of Military Veterans, the oldest veterans organization organisation in South Africa
 Society of the Cavaliers of the Order of Lāčplēsis & Freedom Fighters, also known as the Legion, a right-wing veterans' organisation founded by Voldemārs Ozols (1884–1949)

Arts and media

Comics 
 Legion (Marvel Comics), a Marvel Comics antihero
 Legion (DC Comics), a DC Comics supervillain
 Legion of Super-Heroes, a DC Comics superhero team
 The Legion (comics), one of the comic books where the Legion of Super-Heroes was published
 Legion, a group of characters from the Spawn series
 Legion (IDW Publishing), a comic book based on the 2010 film of the same name
 Legion, a member of the Special Executive
 L.E.G.I.O.N., a 1989 DC Comics title and a team of superheroes, the 20th Century forerunners to the Legion of Superheroes
 Ghostbusters: Legion, a 2004 comic book series

Film and television 
 "Legion" (Law & Order: Criminal Intent), the eighteenth episode in the second season of Law & Order: Criminal Intent
 "Legion" (Red Dwarf), the second episode of Red Dwarf Series VI
 Legion (1998 film) a 1998 made-for-television film
 Legion (2010 film) a 2010 apocalyptic supernatural action film
 The Legion (film) a 2020 film starring Mickey Rourke
 Legions (film), a 2022 Argentine supernatural horror film
 Legion (TV series), an FX TV series based on the Marvel Comics character
 "Legion", an eighth-season episode of the television series Smallville
 Legion, an alien kaiju seen in the film Gamera 2: Attack of Legion
 Legion, a fictional computer network in the 2019 film Terminator: Dark Fate

Games 
 Legion, a often appearing enemy in the Castlevania series.
 Legion Gold, or simply Legion, a strategy game
 Legions (Magic: The Gathering), a set of cards in the game Magic: The Gathering
 Legion (Mass Effect), the adopted name of a synthetic intelligence in Mass Effect 2
 Legion, central villain of the video game Shadow Man
 Legion, an artificial intelligence unit in Command & Conquer 3: Kane's Wrath
 World of Warcraft: Legion, the sixth World of Warcraft expansion set
The Legion, a group of killer characters in the horror video game Dead by Daylight
Watch Dogs: Legion, an action-adventure game and the third installment in the Watch Dogs series

Plays 
 Legion, a play by Hal Corley

In print 
 Legion (novella series), a series of novellas by Brandon Sanderson
 Legion, a unit in the army of the fictional The Domination
 Legion (Blatty novel), a 1983 novel by William Peter Blatty
 Legion (demon), a group of demons referred to in the Christian Bible
 Legion, by Dan Abnett, book 7 in the Horus Heresy book series
 The Legion (novel), a 2010 historical novel by Simon Scarrow

Music 
 Legion Records, started in 1997 by Michael Brosnan under the name Goatboy Records
 Legion (band) a deathcore band from Columbus, Ohio
 Legion, stage name of Erik Hagstedt, Swedish vocalist in the black metal band Marduk
 The Legion, a hip hop group from the Bronx, New York, associated with Black Sheep
 Legion (album), a 1992 album by Deicide
 Legion, a 1985 album by Mark Shreeve
 Legions, a 2013 album by the Danish band Artillery
 "Legion", a song by Candiria from the album Kiss the Lie
 "Legion", a song by HammerFall from the album No Sacrifice, No Victory
 "Legion", a song by Junkie XL from the album Big Sounds of the Drags
 "Legion", a song by Saviour Machine from the album Saviour Machine I
 "Legion", a song by Slaughter Lord, covered by At the Gates in the 2002 re-issue of the album Slaughter of the Soul
 "Legion", a song by VNV Nation from the album Empires
 "Legions", a song by Winds of Plague from the album Decimate the Weak

Sports 
 Legion Field, a stadium in Birmingham, Alabama
 Legion Sports Complex, a complex in Wilmington, North Carolina
 Legion Stadium, the main stadium in the Legion Sports Complex
 Racine Legion, an American football team from 1922 to 1925

Other uses 
 Legion (demons), the collective name of the demons in the gospel account of the Gerasene demoniac
 Legion Park (disambiguation)
 Legion (taxonomy), a taxonomic rank in biology
 Legion (software), a computer software system
 Legion Interactive, an Australian telecommunications company
 Catholic Legion (disambiguation)